Stefano Zannowich (18 February 1751–25 May 1786) was an adventurer from Budva who gained considerable notoriety for posing as royalty. His most important published work was the 1776 "Turkish Letters".

Biography
Zanović was born in Budva, at the time in Venetian Albania, now Montenegro. He was born in Paštrovići. He was the fourth child of Antun Zanović, a wealthy merchant and shoemaker, and his wife Franka (née Marković). He had older brothers named Marko (b. 1745), Primislav (b. 1747) and his namesake Stjepan (b. 1749) who died at an early age. After him, his parents had Vincislav (b. 1755) and Miroslav (1761-1834), and two daughters, Marija Jelisaveta (b. 1753) and Teresia Giustiniana (b. 1758). His father was known as Budaljanin or Buduan in Venice, indicating his origin from Budva. The large number of siblings allowed them to constantly change identities, falsely impersonating one another, often making confusion by allegedly appearing in two places at the same time. His oldest brother Marko went to Russia in 1781 and became a count, living in Škłoŭ on the estate of Semyon Zorich. In 1783 he was arrested alongside his brother Anibal, for covering his brother's money counterfeiting operation. Mentioned Anibal is not the same person as Stjepan, more likely Primislav who used the same alias. They were imprisoned in Siberia until 1788 when they were pardoned by Catherine due to Zorich's intervention and because of Stjepan's fame in western Europe, where he always glorified Russian empress. Upon release they left for Arhangelsk, not to be mentioned again. His youngest brother Miroslav also adopted the title of count, enrolled in politics as a staunch opponent of Venetian aspirations towards Dalmatia and a freemason. He was a delegate of Budva on the unification assembly of Montenegro and Boka in 1813. He also published the book Thoughts and sonnets and died at a very old age in 1834. Of all his relatives, Stjepan, alongside Primislav who was often his partner in con schemes, is perhaps the best known.
Stjepan claimed descendance from Skanderbeg. Stefan completed his education in Venice and Padua. He met Casanova through his brother Primislav in Florence, where he was part of the Accademia degli Apatisti, later known as the Accademia Fiorentina. In Florence he made his first move by bankrupting an English lord in a game of cards, for which he was expelled from Florence. In 1769 both he and his brother were expelled from Venice, as well as from Treviso the following year for document forgery and false representation. Somewhere after 1772 he undertook a trip to London in order to collect his card winnings. During this voyage he visited much of France, including Marseille, Aix-en-Provence, Lyon and eventually Paris, where he was moving in social circles around Encyclopédistes, thus meeting d'Alembert, Marmontel and Rousseau. His first works Opera diverse and Poesie were printed in 1773 in Paris and Milan respectively.

Zannowich's life is full of controversy, scarce on facts and full of fictional events that were the most likely product of his own imagination. Various fragments were recorded by his acquaintances. Apparently, at the age of 17, after a robbery he committed, he escaped to Dalmatia and became a brigand leader. Later he came to Montenegro, where, by his own account, he presented himself as Russian tsar Peter III and became the head of the country. Zannowich did, in fact, visit Montenegro on 5 May 1774 with unclear motives. Obviously seeking to profit from the power vacuum after the death of Stephen the Little, the actual impostor of Peter III, he later took over his identity and presented himself across Europe as the man who caused such political intrigue. It is widely regarded as true that he actually met Stephen, even writing a couple of words about him in 1784, in which he made a clear distinction between the two of them. He mentioned himself in the passage as being one of Stephen's generals in the latter's battles against the Turks. After the supposed meeting he left Montenegro for the first time in 1769 for Vienna only to return five years later. While in Vienna he tried to gain support from local Orthodox deacons for his plan to seize power in Montenegro, and it is at this point that he started his quest on proving his own noble heritage, alleged connection with Skenderbeg, etc. He claimed that the people of Montenegro as well as Prince-bishop Sava were asking him to take over the country, but that his adventurous spirit was longing for something more. In reality, he was expelled by Montenegrins who wanted to avoid being clutched by yet another impostor. So, he left the country for the second time and accompanied by archimandrite Petar I, who would later become metropolitan himself, and a group of Montenegrins he reached Vienna through Rijeka. Once in Vienna he split with his traveling group and via Strasbourg and Frankfurt he left for Poland. There he took an alias Niarta and became the protégé of the prince Michał Kazimierz Ogiński, whom he exploited financially. In 1775 he went to Dresden where his Opere Postume and Lettere turche were printed, moving to Berlin the following year. There he failed to gain the trust of Frederick the Great, who immediately saw right through him, but in turn grew increasingly close with his heir Frederick William II. Johann Christian von Mannlich recounts how well he was received in Zweibrücken in 1778, only to be arrested and his residence permit denied after an incriminating letter against him arrived from Berlin. Spending some time under various false identities in Alsace and Lorraine, he arrived in Rome where, despite an age difference, he started an affair with Duchess of Kingston. The pair then left for Russia. In 1780 he was in Groningen, moving to Amsterdam and eventually ending in Antwerp. There he befriended Charles-Joseph de Ligne, who dedicated a poem to Stefan, and spent six months enjoying his hospitality at Château de Belœil. During his stay in Belgium, clearly not eager to abandon his political ambitions involving Montenegro, he devised a plan to place the country under the protection of Joseph II, whose intervention saved him from prison in Vienna in 1778. He claimed to be able to assemble up to 10,000 Montenegrins ready to fight for the emperor's interests in Austrian Netherlands. Stefan's plot collapsed while he was in Ath, from where he left yet another time for Frankfurt, where he resided from 19 March to 12 June in 1784. Living off various hoaxes and frauds, he there collected 5,764 Dutch guilders from a bank using a false promissory note from Duchess of Kingston. On 11 August 1784, he arrived in Frauenbrünnl monastery in Abbach near Straubing and presented himself as an exiled prince seeking sanctuary and peace, thus spending some time there, making it his seat of operations in the process. He regularly paid visits to Augsburg, Regensburg and Munich, establishing contacts with wealthy merchants and persuading them to enter Dutch market where he had considerable influence. During his time in Frauenbrünnl, he rarely left his room and often made overgenerous contributions to the poor locals.

His other name was Hanibal. 

He was a pen pal of Gluck, Pietro Metastasio, Voltaire, Jean le Rond d'Alembert, Jean Jacques Rousseau, Catherine the Great, and Frederick William II of Prussia, to whom he dedicated a book of French verses translated from Italian, "L'Alcoran des Princes Destinés au Trone". 

Giacomo Casanova mentions Stefano Zannovich, who "paid a visit to Vienna under the alias of Prince Castriotto d'Albanie. Under pressure of the authorities, he left at the end of July 1784" for Poland and later for the Netherlands (United Provinces).

He died in Amsterdam, Dutch Republic.

Work
He wrote in Italian, French, Latin, German, and Serbian.

The most important work was Lettere turche, first published in Dresden in 1776. Serbian literary historiography never treated them as a novelist. With the latest research and study, Zannowich's work now belongs to the genre of an epistolary novel, a form especially popular in the Age of Enlightenment.

La Didone, scena drammatica. Ottava edizione (1772)
Opere Diverse (1773)
Pigmalione (1773)
Riflessioni filosofiche-morali (1773)
Lettere turche (1776)
Le Grand Castriotto d' Albanie (Paris 1779)
La poésie et la philosophie d'un Turc (1779)
L'Horoscope politique de la Pologne, de la Prusse, de l'Angleterre, etc. (1779)
L'Anima, poema filosofico (?)
Epîtres pathétiques addressées à Frédéric-Guillaume, Prince-royal de Prusse (1780)
Correspondence Littéraire Secrète (1786) 
Histoire de la vie et des aventures de la duchesse de Kingston (1789)

Legacy

At the turn of the 20th century, Pavel Rovinski, a long-time expatriate to Montenegro, published a short monography on Zanović. Mirko Breyer included Zanović in his 1904 lexicon of Croatian literary and cultural history. In 1928, he wrote a monography about the Zanović family, published by Matica hrvatska. This piece turned out to be a seminal work that encouraged a large amount of interest in Zanović, from the likes of Vladimir Nazor, Milo Dor,  and Petar Džadžić.

There is a story of Stephan Zannovich in Alfred Döblin's 1929 novel Berlin Alexanderplatz.

In 1998, the Budva high school organized an international assembly of literary critics about Zanović, attended by Gojko Čelebić,  and others.

The Croatian Encyclopedia describes him as a 'Croatian writer and adventurer'.

See also
 Tomo Medin

References

Sources

Further reading

1751 births
1786 deaths
18th-century Serbian people
Serbian writers
People from Budva
Republic of Venice people
Venetian Slavs
Serbs of Montenegro
Impostors